Philippe Jaenada (born 1964 in Saint-Germain-en-Laye) is a French writer. The author of over a dozen books, he won the Prix Femina for his 2017 novel La Serpe.

References

1964 births
Living people
French writers
Prix Femina winners